Armando Rafael Maita Urbáez (born 26 August 1981) is a Venezuelan international footballer who plays professionally for Yaracuyanos as a striker.

Club career 
Born in San Félix, Maita has played club football for Mineros de Guayana, Carabobo, Aragua, Maracaibo, Monagas, Deportivo Táchira, Deportivo Anzoátegui, Atlético Huila and Deportivo Petare.

International career
He earned five international caps for Venezuela between 2006 and 2008.

References

External links
Armando Maita at Footballdatabase

1981 births
Living people
People from Bolívar (state)
Venezuelan footballers
Association football forwards
A.C.C.D. Mineros de Guayana players
Carabobo F.C. players
Aragua FC players
UA Maracaibo players
Monagas S.C. players
Deportivo Táchira F.C. players
Deportivo Anzoátegui players
Atlético Huila footballers
Deportivo Miranda F.C. players
Asociación Civil Deportivo Lara players
Caracas FC players
Atlético Pantoja players
Yaracuyanos FC players
Venezuelan Primera División players
Categoría Primera A players
Venezuela international footballers
Venezuelan expatriate footballers
Expatriate footballers in Colombia
Expatriate footballers in the Dominican Republic
Venezuelan expatriate sportspeople in Colombia
Venezuelan expatriate sportspeople in the Dominican Republic
Liga Dominicana de Fútbol players